The Breisgau S-Bahn, branded as Breisgau-S-Bahn 2020, is an S-Bahn network centered on Freiburg im Breisgau in Baden-Württemberg, Germany.

Lines 
The network comprises six lines, three operated by DB Regio Baden-Württemberg and three by SWEG Südwestdeutsche Landesverkehrs-AG (SWEG):

References

External links 
 Deutsche Bahn project site 

Transport in Freiburg im Breisgau
Breisgau
Breisgau-Hochschwarzwald
Emmendingen (district)
Rapid transit in Germany